The 21st Senate District of Wisconsin is one of 33 districts in the Wisconsin State Senate.  Located in southeastern Wisconsin, the district comprises most of Kenosha and Racine counties.  The district includes the city of Burlington and part of the city of Racine, as well as the villages of Bristol, Caledonia, Paddock Lake, Pleasant Prairie, Rochester, Salem Lakes, Sturtevant, Twin Lakes, and Union Grove, and the portions of the villages of Mount Pleasant and Somers west of Wisconsin Highway 31.

Current elected officials
Van H. Wanggaard is the senator representing the 21st district. He was elected to his first term in the 2010 general election, but was removed from office in a recall election in 2012.  He subsequently was returned to office in the 2014 general election, and is now in his second four-year term.

Each Wisconsin State Senate district is composed of three Wisconsin State Assembly districts.  The 21st Senate district comprises the 61st, 62nd, and 63rd Assembly districts.  The current representatives of those districts are: 
 Assembly District 61: Amanda Nedweski (R–Pleasant Prairie)
 Assembly District 62: Robert Wittke (R–Wind Point)
 Assembly District 63: Robin Vos (R–Rochester)

The district is located entirely within Wisconsin's 1st congressional district, which is represented by U.S. Representative Bryan Steil.

Recalls
The 21st Senate district is unique in Wisconsin recall history.  In 1996, it became the first district in which a Wisconsin state legislator was successfully removed from office via recall election, when Kimberly Plache defeated George Petak. With the recall of Van H. Wanggaard in 2012, it became the only Wisconsin district where there have been more than one successful recall elections.

Boundaries
As with all state senate and assembly seats, the boundaries of the 21st have moved over time during decennial redistricting. Senators of previous eras have represented different geographic areas.

The district was created after the 1850 census and reapportionment and was drawn for Winnebago County, in central Wisconsin.  The inaugural holder was Coles Bashford in the 6th session of the Wisconsin Legislature, 1853.

In the 19th century, the district included at various times Marathon, Oconto, Shawano and Waupaca counties, and was located within the now-defunct 9th Congressional District

For most of the 20th century, the district covered the city of Racine and Racine County, in southeastern Wisconsin, within the boundaries of the 1st Congressional District.

In redistricting after the 2010 census, the city of Racine was mostly removed and rural and suburban portions of Kenosha County were added to the district, turning the 21st into a safe Republican seat.

Past senators
The 21st senate district has had several notable officeholders, including American Civil War General John Azor Kellogg and Wisconsin Governors Coles Bashford and Walter Samuel Goodland.

A list of all previous senators from this district:

References

External links
District Website

Wisconsin State Senate districts
Racine County, Wisconsin
Kenosha County, Wisconsin
1852 establishments in Wisconsin